The 1990 United States Senate election in Delaware was held on November 6, 1990. Incumbent Democratic U.S. Senator Joe Biden won re-election to a fourth term, defeating Republican challenger M. Jane Brady.

General election

Candidates 
 Joe Biden (D), incumbent Delaware Senator running for a fourth consecutive term 
 M. Jane Brady (R), Deputy Attorney General of Delaware
 Lee Rosenbaum (L)

Results

See also 
 1990 United States Senate elections

References 

1990
Delaware
1990 Delaware elections
s